Posht-e Gol may refer to:
 Posht-e Gol, Mazandaran
 Posht-e Gol, West Azerbaijan